Mian Shaukat Hussain (1930 – 25 January 1996) was a Pakistani tabla player who belonged to the Punjab gharana of tabla-playing music artists.

Early life
He was born to a family of professional musicians. His father, Mian Maula Bakhsh, was a professional singer. But young Shaukat was drawn to percussion instruments from an early age. He began his career from All India Radio, Delhi in 1945. At this radio station, he was very much influenced by the then tabla maestros Ahmed Jan Thirakwa's and Alla Rakha's performances.  His family migrated to Pakistan after its independence in 1947. In Pakistan, he was employed by Radio Pakistan, Lahore as a staff artist for 43 years.

Career
He was a disciple or student of renowned tabla maestro Mian Qadir Baksh, founder of the Punjab gharana of tabla players who also was the teacher of many tabla players that later gained international recognition. Mian Qadir Baksh was known throughout the world for his skill and mastery of tabla. After learning the art of tabla playing from Mian Qadir Baksh, Mian Shaukat Hussain soon started gaining recognition in the music circles in Pakistan and was the music group accompanist of choice for Pakistan's great classical music vocalists and instrumentalists including Salamat Ali Khan, Amanat Ali Khan-Bade Fateh Ali Khan (classical-music-singing-duo), Roshan Ara Begum, Mehdi Hassan, Ghulam Ali and many others during the 1950s, 1960s, 1970s and 1980s. It requires intellect and sensitivity from the tabla player to figure out what the classical music vocalists expect from the accompanying tabla player as the singers go about their singing. He has to have the ability to read the minds of the singers. When these artists performed on Pakistan Television shows, they frequently selected Mian Shaukat Hussain as tabla player to accompany them on stage. Also riding on a wave of success, Mian Shaukat Hussain toured Europe, Africa, India and Bangladesh with these artists. Another contemporary famous tabla player in Pakistan is Tari Khan, who is now known as the Prince of Tabla of Pakistan, was also a disciple of Mian Shaukat Hussain, "who is said to be a 'ditto copy' of the great ustad" – according to a major newspaper of Pakistan, The Friday Times.

The same newspaper also states, "In the early 1990s, Ustad Zakir Hussain (musician), India's famous young tabla player, paid a visit to Pakistan and was performing at Lahore's Pearl Continental Hotel. When Ustad Shaukat Hussain walked in, Zakir stopped playing, came down from the stage, stooped before Shaukat and presented him with 'nazrana', declaring that while his own father, the great Ustad Alla Rakha, was in India at present, his musical father was right here in front of him."

Awards and recognition
 Amir Khusrow Music Award in 1979 and in 1983
 Pride of Performance Award by the President of Pakistan in 1985

Death 
Mian Shaukat Hussain retired in 1992 and died 4 years later on 25 January 1996 of kidney failure. His on-stage tabla performances showed his high level of skills. According to a major Pakistani newspaper,  Ustad Shaukat Hussain has been ranked amongst the finest tabla players of Pakistan.

See also
Here are some other prominent tabla players:
 Ahmed Jan Thirakwa
 Alla Rakha
 Zakir Hussain
 Ustad Tafu
 Tari Khan

References

External links
Profile of Mian Shaukat Hussain on tablapassion.com website

1930 births
1996 deaths
People from Jalandhar district
Instrumental gharanas
Tabla gharanas
Punjabi culture
Pakistani percussionists
Tabla players
Hand drums
Pakistani musicians
Classical music in Pakistan
Recipients of the Pride of Performance